Major Cyril James Hastings Tolley MC (14 September 1895 – 18 May 1978) was a British amateur golf champion and briefly a Liberal Party politician. He died in Eastbourne.

Background
Tolley was the son of James T. Tolley and Christiana Mary Pascall. He was educated at University College, Oxford. He won the Military Cross at Ypres during the First World War. In the Second World War, he commanded a company of the Royal Sussex Regiment and was a liaison officer with the United States Army.

Professional career
Tolley was connected with the London Stock Exchange. He lived for a time in New York.

Golfing career
Tolley twice won The Amateur Championship, in 1920 and 1929. In the 4th round in 1930 at St Andrews he lost to Bobby Jones on the 19th hole after Jones had laid a "horrid stymie" with Tolley within 4 feet of the hole. Jones eventually won the tournament. He won the French Open in 1924 and 1928 and was the Welsh Open Amateur Championship in 1921 and 1923. Tolley played in the first Walker Cup in 1922 and again in 1923, 1924, 1926, 1930, and 1934. He captained the team in 1924. He was captain of the R&A in 1948, being one of the few captains to play in the Amateur Championship during their year of office, losing in the third round to defending champion Willie Turnesa.

In 1928, Tolley launched a libel action against J. S. Fry & Sons of Bristol, chocolate manufacturers. Frys had produced an advert in which Tolley was caricatured and which contained a limerick, published in two newspapers in June 1928. Tolley claimed that the advert suggested that he had made some financial gain and had been guilty of conduct unworthy of his status as an amateur golfer. In 1929, Tolley won £1,000 damages although this decision was set aside by the Court of Appeal. Tolley then took the case to the House of Lords where he was successful but it was decided that the damages were excessive. Eventually, in July 1931, he received £500 damages and costs.

Tournament wins
1920 The Amateur Championship
1921 Welsh Open Amateur
1923 Golf Illustrated Gold Vase, Welsh Open Amateur
1924 French Open
1926 Golf Illustrated Gold Vase (tie with Tony Torrance)
1928 French Open, Golf Illustrated Gold Vase
1929 The Amateur Championship

Major championships

Amateur wins (2)

Results timeline

Note: Tolley only played in The Open Championship, the U.S. Amateur, and The Amateur Championship.

LA = Low amateur
NT = No tournament
DNQ = Did not qualify for match play portion
R256, R128, R64, R32, R16, QF, SF = Round in which player lost in match play
"T" indicates a tie for a place

Team appearances
Walker Cup (representing Great Britain & Ireland): 1922, 1923, 1924 (playing captain), 1926, 1930, 1934
Great Britain vs USA (representing Great Britain): 1921
England–Scotland Amateur Match (representing England): 1922, 1923, 1924 (winners), 1925 (winners), 1926 (winners), 1927 (tie), 1928 (winners), 1929 (tie), 1930 (winners)

Political career
On 3 December 1949, Tolley was adopted as the North Devon Liberal Association's prospective parliamentary candidate. North Devon was a winnable seat, however, by 11 January 1950, he had been replaced as prospective candidate. Instead he became Liberal candidate for the less winnable Hendon South division of Middlesex for the 1950 General Election;

He did not stand for parliament again. He continued his activity in the Liberal Party, serving as Honorary Treasurer of the London Liberal Party from 1950 to 1951. By the end of the decade he had left the Liberals and joined the Conservative Party. He was elected to Eastbourne Borough Council in 1958 and served for one 4-year term.

References

External links
Cyril Tolley about American golf

English male golfers
Amateur golfers
Liberal Party (UK) parliamentary candidates
Alumni of University College, Oxford
British Army personnel of World War I
British Army personnel of World War II
Royal Sussex Regiment officers
1895 births
1978 deaths